Periphetes (Ancient Greek: Περιφήτης) is the name of several characters from Greek mythology.

 Periphetes, an Arcadian king as the son of Nyctimus, son of King Lycaon. He was the father of Parthaon, ancestor of Psophis, one of the possible eponyms for the city of Psophis.
 Periphetes, also known as Corynetes (Κορυνήτης) meaning Club-Bearer from the club (κορύνη) which he carried, was a son of Hephaestus and Anticleia or of Poseidon.  Periphetes was lame like his father and used a bronze club as a crutch. He roamed the road from Athens to Troezen where he robbed travelers and killed them with his club. Theseus encountered and killed him near Epidauros (See Plutarch, Life of Theseus, et al.).
 Periphetes, son of Copreus; he was killed during the Trojan war by Hector.
 Periphetes, king of Mygdonia. He fought with Sithon for the hand of the latter's daughter Pallene and was killed.
 Periphetes, a Trojan who was killed by Teucer.

Other use 

 Periphetes is a genus of Phasmatodea in the subfamily Lonchodinae.

Notes

References 

 Conon, Fifty Narrations, surviving as one-paragraph summaries in the Bibliotheca (Library) of Photius, Patriarch of Constantinople translated from the Greek by Brady Kiesling. Online version at the Topos Text Project.
 Gaius Julius Hyginus, Fabulae from The Myths of Hyginus translated and edited by Mary Grant. University of Kansas Publications in Humanistic Studies. Online version at the Topos Text Project.
Homer, The Iliad with an English Translation by A.T. Murray, Ph.D. in two volumes. Cambridge, MA., Harvard University Press; London, William Heinemann, Ltd. 1924. . Online version at the Perseus Digital Library.
Homer, Homeri Opera in five volumes. Oxford, Oxford University Press. 1920. . Greek text available at the Perseus Digital Library.
 Pausanias, Description of Greece with an English Translation by W.H.S. Jones, Litt.D., and H.A. Ormerod, M.A., in 4 Volumes. Cambridge, MA, Harvard University Press; London, William Heinemann Ltd. 1918. Online version at the Perseus Digital Library
 Pausanias, Graeciae Descriptio. 3 vols. Leipzig, Teubner. 1903.  Greek text available at the Perseus Digital Library.

Princes in Greek mythology
Mythological kings of Arcadia
Kings in Greek mythology
Children of Hephaestus
Children of Poseidon
Trojans
Labours of Theseus
Arcadian mythology